Montgomery Village is an open-air retail destination in Santa Rosa, CA that’s been a fixture in the community for 70+ years. Located just an hour from San Francisco, the center is situated directly on Highway 12, which connects the Sonoma and Napa Valleys with the Sacramento-San Joaquin River Delta and the Sierra Foothills. This convenient location makes Montgomery Village an ideal stop for locals and wine country visitors looking to share a meal, shop small businesses alongside beloved national brands, enjoy live music and simply relax.

Today, Montgomery Village’s 280,000 square feet of retail space is home to 60+ shops, services and eateries, including lululemon, Rise Cycle Co., Avid Coffee, Sonoma Outfitters, Sur La Table, Copperfield's Books, See's Candies, Lori Austin Gallery and many more. With the addition of scenic spaces, pet-friendly amenities and thoughtful programming, Montgomery Village will continue its legacy as a community hub for generations to come.

History
Santa Rosa developer and two-time city councilman Hugh Codding purchased a pair of orchards south of Montgomery Drive with the intention of building a shopping complex. He created Montgomery Village Development Co. and began construction on the center in 1949; it opened the following year, featuring about a dozen businesses. The shopping center was part of the unincorporated Montgomery Village neighborhood that Codding proposed as its own city; the area was incorporated into Santa Rosa in 1955.

The center has since grown to nearly 300,000 square feet. Its Village Court Stage is the site of regular live concerts and events.

Mall occupants
Because Montgomery Village is an open-air mall, its businesses line several streets including Farmers Lane, Montgomery Drive, Midway Drive, Magowan Drive and Sonoma Avenue. Occupants include:

Retail outlets
 lululemon 
 Sur La Table
 Ross Dress For Less
 Lucky
 Copperfield's Books
 Great Clips
 Kaleidoscope Toys
 Patrick James
 Talbots
 White House Black Market

Restaurants
 RAKU Ramin
 SEA THAI Bistro
 Tony's Galley

Others
 United States Postal Service
 Bank of America
 Chase Bank
 Exchange Bank
 Summit State Bank
 U.S. Bank

References

External links
 Official Website

Buildings and structures in Santa Rosa, California
Economy of Santa Rosa, California
Shopping malls established in 1950
Shopping malls in California
Shopping malls in the San Francisco Bay Area